Hanxi Changlong Station is an interchange station on Line 3 and Line 7 of Guangzhou Metro that started operation on 28December 2006. It is located under the east side of Hanxi Avenue, Xinguang Expressway, and the south of Chime-Long Paradise Amusement Park in Dashi Subdistrict (zh) of Panyu District of Guangzhou. There is a free shuttle bus connecting the station with the amusement park.

Before the station started operation, it was called "Hanxi Station" and "Changlong Station" successively. The residents nearby were disappointed with the name "Changlong Station" because they felt that the name favoured the Chimelong Group, Chimelong Paradise's owner and operator. The Guangzhou Municipal Government later approved a change of name to "Hanxi Changlong Station" which satisfied both the residents and the enterprise.

Station layout

See also 
Chimelong Paradise

References

Railway stations in China opened in 2006
Guangzhou Metro stations in Panyu District